Initially, a total of 110 retired cricket players agreed to participate in the tournament. The tournament resumed in 2021 with England Legends and Bangladesh Legends replacing the Brett Lee led Australia Legends, who withdrew from the tournament due to their inability to travel in India owing to the strict COVID-19 restrictions in Australia.

India Legends 
Initially, in 2020, Abey Kuruvilla was named to the India Legends squad, but due to an injured shoulder, he was replaced by Noel David.

Subramaniam Badrinath, Naman Ojha, Yusuf Pathan, Vinay Kumar, and Rajesh Pawar were added to the India Legends squad for the year 2021, by replacing Zaheer Khan, Ajit Agarkar, Sameer Dighe, Abey Kuruvilla, Sanjay Bangar, Sairaj Bahutule  who were part of the squad initially in 2020.

Sri Lanka Legends
Sanath Jayasuriya, Nuwan Kulasekara, Dhammika Prasad, Upul Tharanga, Russel Arnold, Kaushalya Weeraratne, Ajantha Mendis, Rangana Herath and Chinthaka Jayasinghe were added to Sri Lanka Legends squad for the year 2021. They replaced Marvan Atapattu, Malinda Warnapura, Chaminda Vaas, Muttiah Muralitharan, Sachithra Senanayake, Upul Chandana and Romesh Kaluwitharana, who were part of the squad initially in 2020.

South Africa Legends
Makhaya Ntini, Justin Kemp, Alviro Petersen, Mornantau Hayward, Andrew Puttick, Thandi Tshabalala, Loots Bosman, Zander de Bruyn and Monde Zondeki were added to the South Africa Legends squad for the year 2021. They replaced Jacques Rudolph, Herschelle Gibbs, Martin van Jaarsveld, Lance Klusener, Ryan McLaren, Johan van der Wath, Albie Morkel, Paul Harris, and Andrew Hall, who were part of the squad initially in 2020.

West Indies Legends
Dwayne Smith, Narsingh Deonarine, Mahendra Nagamootoo, William Perkins, and Ryan Austin were added to the West Indies Legends squad for the year 2021. They replaced Shivnarine Chanderpaul, Ramnaresh Sarwan, Darren Ganga, Ricardo Powell, Samuel Badree, and Danza Hyatt, who were part of the squad initially in 2020.

Australia Legends
The Australia Legends team was captained by Brett Lee in the first season of Road Safety World Series. After the tournament was halted due to global coronavirus pandemic, the remaining seven matches were rescheduled to a later date and eventually called off. Although they played one match against Sri Lanka Legends at Wankhede Stadium in Mumbai, where they lost by 7 runs.

When the organizers decided to resume the tournament, they forfeited all their remaining matches as they could not travel to India due to strict COVID-19 rules imposed by the Australian government.

England Legends
In 2021, England Legends were added to the tournament after Australia Legends opted out due to COVID-19. Kevin Pietersen was named as the captain for the team.

Bangladesh Legends
In 2021, Bangladesh Legends were added to the tournament after Australia Legends opted out due to COVID-19. Initially, Khaled Mahmud was named as the captain, but Mohammad Rafique led the team.

References

World Series Cricket